The Vietnam women's national football team is a women's football team representing Vietnam and controlled by Vietnam Football Federation (VFF). This is one of the most successful women's football teams in Southeast Asia and ranks 6th in Asia.

History

Early history and an established Southeast Asian powerhouse
Vietnam women's football established in 1990, but it wasn't until 1997 that the women's team had the first match. The team has become one of the most powerful football women's team in Southeast Asia since 2001 with Thailand. Vietnam cemented its position in the region by winning gold medals at the AFF Women's Championship in 2006, 2012 and 2019. Also, in the SEA Games women's level, Vietnam also cemented its position, winning gold in 2001, 2003, 2005, 2009, 2017, 2019 and 2021 editions.

In spite of being a major powerhouse in Southeast Asian women's football, Vietnam has fallen short in continental tournaments like the AFC Women's Asian Cup and Asian Games. Vietnam first qualified for the Women's Asian Cup in 1999 and has since maintained the qualifying streak, and had hosted the competitions twice, first in 2008 and second in 2014, but Vietnam failed to progress from the group stage each time. To make the matter worse, Vietnam even missed out the 2015 FIFA Women's World Cup in a painful playoff defeat at home to arch-rival Thailand 1–2.

At the Asian Games, Vietnam first participated in the 1998 Asian Games in Thailand, and for the first four editions, Vietnam had little to impress, and Vietnam's first win only came in the 2010 Asian Games. Vietnam made a major breakthrough at the 2014 Asian Games, finishing fourth place for the first time. Vietnam again progressed from the group stage in the 2018 Asian Games, but failed to Chinese Taipei after penalty shootout.

First Women's World Cup
In the pre-2022 AFC Women's Asian Cup friendlies in Spain, preparations had been plagued by the COVID-19 pandemic as several players were found to be infected with the virus. However, the Vietnamese side was able to have enough players for the group stage, where they lost to two Asian powerhouses South Korea and Japan both by 0–3. The Vietnamese team finally reached the quarter-finals of a Women's Asian Cup for the first-time after a struggling 2–2 draw with Myanmar, which also effectively knocked the Burmese out of the tournament. In Vietnam's first knockout phase experience, Vietnam lost to China at the quarterfinals, then entered the playoff phase against old foes Thailand and Chinese Taipei. This time, with Thailand and Chinese Taipei plagued by coronavirus, Vietnam was able to win the playoff round, thus qualified for the 2023 FIFA Women's World Cup, their first World Cup in history. The successful participation of Vietnam women's team has been notable after a string of football reforms initiated since late 2010s to promote women's football at universal level such as schools, universities and companies after the failure to qualify for the 2015 Women's World Cup, though challenges have persisted due to cultural issues and the lack of a professional domestic league in the country. To further improve Vietnam women's football standard, an attempt to create an independent development fund for women's football has been underlined, while calls to professionalise the domestic league have also been taken for the first time.

Team image

Nicknames
The team doesn't have nickname officially. They has been known by several nicknames are self-named by fans and media such as Những Nữ Chiến Binh Sao Vàng (Golden Star Women Warriors), similar to the nickname Những Chiến Binh Sao Vàng (Golden Star Warriors) from the men's team.

Home stadium

Vietnam plays their home matches on the Mỹ Đình National Stadium, Thống Nhất Stadium or Cẩm Phả Stadium.

Kit suppliers

Sponsorship 
Primary sponsors include: Honda, Yanmar, Grand Sport, Sony, Bia Saigon, Acecook, Coca-Cola, Vinamilk, Kao Vietnam, Herbalife Nutrition and TNI Corporation.

FIFA World Ranking

Results and fixtures

The following is a list of match results in the last 12 months, as well as any future matches that have been scheduled.

Legend

2023

 Vietnam Fixtures and Results – Soccerway.com

Coaching staff

Current coaching staff

Manager history

Players

Current squad
The following 25 players were called up for the 2022 AFF Women's Championship in Philippines from 4–17 July 2022.
Caps and goals are updated as of 17 July 2022 after the match against  Myanmar.

Recent call-ups
The following players have also been called up to a squad in the last 12 months.

Notes:
INJ Player withdrew from the squad due to an injury
RET Retired from the national team
WD Player withdrew from the squad for non-injury related reasons

Records

*Players in bold are still active, at least at club level.

Most capped players

Top goalscorers

Honours

Regional
AFF Women's Championship
Appearances (12): 2004, 2006, 2007, 2008, 2011, 2012, 2013, 2015, 2016, 2018, 2019, 2022

 Winners (3): 2006, 2012, 2019
 Runners-up (3): 2004, 2008, 2016
 Third place (5): 2004, 2007, 2011, 2013, 2018
Fourth place (2): 2015, 2022

SEA Games
Appearances (10): 1997, 2001, 2003, 2005, 2007, 2009, 2013, 2017, 2019, 2021

 Gold Medal (7): 2001, 2003, 2005, 2009, 2017, 2019, 2021 (Record) 
 Silver Medal (2): 2007, 2013
 Bronze Medal (1): 1997

Centuriate goals

Competitive record

FIFA Women's World Cup

Olympic Games

AFC Women's Asian Cup

Asian Games

AFF Women's Championship

Southeast Asian Games

Head-to-head record
, after the match against .

See also

Sport in Vietnam
Football in Vietnam
Women's football in Vietnam
Vietnam Football Federation
Vietnam women's national football team
Vietnam women's national football team results
List of Vietnam women's international footballers
Vietnam women's national under-20 football team
Vietnam women's national under-17 football team
Vietnam women's national futsal team
Vietnam men's national football team

References

Notes

External links
 Official website
 

 
Asian women's national association football teams